Paul (Boulos) Abdel Sater (born 20 September 1962 in Aïn El Remmaneh, Lebanon) is a Curial bishop of the Maronite Catholic Patriarchate of Antioch.

Life
Paul Abdel Sater received his ordination to the priesthood on 29 June 1987 and became priest of the Maronite Catholic Archeparchy of Beirut.

The Synod of the Maronite Church of Antioch elected him Curial Bishop of the Maronite Patriarchate, with Pope Francis confirming his election on July 28, 2015, and appointing him as the titular bishop of Ptolemais in Phoenicia.
Maronite Patriarch of Antioch, Cardinal Bechara Boutros al-Rahi, O.M.M., ordained on 5 September of the same year to the episcopate. His co-consecrators were Archeparch of Beirut, Paul Youssef Matar, and the Archeparch of Haifa and the Holy Land, Moussa El-Hage, O.A.M.

References

External links

1962 births
Lebanese Maronites
Living people
21st-century Maronite Catholic bishops